Minami Ishida (born 14 May 1991) is a Japanese professional footballer who plays as a defender for WE League club Nojima Stella Kanagawa Sagamihara.

Club career 
Ishida made her WE League debut on 26 September 2021.

References 

WE League players
Living people
1991 births
Japanese women's footballers
Women's association football defenders
Association football people from Shizuoka Prefecture
Nojima Stella Kanagawa Sagamihara players